Oliver Peters may refer to:

Oliver Peters, character in 12 Monkeys (TV series)
Oliver Peters, character in Operation Diplomat (film)

See also
Oliver Petersch, footballer